Janet Ward (February 19, 1925 – August 2, 1995) was an American actress. She appeared in the films Fail Safe (1964), The Anderson Tapes (1971) and Night Moves (1975). She appeared in the television series Alfred Hitchcock Presents, Perry Mason, The Defenders, N.Y.P.D., Cannon, Barney Miller, Kojak and Law & Order.

She died of a heart attack on August 2, 1995, in Manhattan, New York City, New York at age 70.

Filmography

References

External links
 
 

1925 births
1995 deaths
20th-century American actresses
American film actresses